Lecco is a city of 48,131 inhabitants in Lombardy, northern Italy,  north of Milan. It lies at the end of the south-eastern branch of Lake Como (the branch is named Branch of Lecco / Ramo di Lecco). The Bergamo Alps rise to the north and east, cut through by the Valsassina of which Lecco marks the southern end.

The lake narrows to form the river Adda, so bridges were built to improve road communications with Como and Milan. There are four bridges crossing the river Adda in Lecco: the Azzone Visconti Bridge (1336–1338), the Kennedy Bridge (1956), the Alessandro Manzoni Bridge (1985), and a railroad bridge.

Lecco was also Alpine Town of the Year in 2013.

Elevated to province by decree of the President of the Republic of March 6, 1992, Lecco obtained the title of city on June 22, 1848.

Known for being the place where the writer Alessandro Manzoni set "The Betrothed", the city is located in one of the vertexes of the Larian Triangle. It overlooks the eastern branch of Lake Como and is included in the Orobic Prealps, between the Grigne mountain chain and the Resegone.

As strategic crossroads for Valtellina, Lecco assumed increasing importance during the Middle Ages when it was annexed to the Duchy of Milan following the Peace of Constance. During the second half of the 19th century, under the Austrian dominion, the city went through a particularly flourishing period during which palaces and arcades in neoclassical style were constructed. After the Unity of Italy, Lecco established itself as one of the most important industrial centers of the nation thanks to the development of the steel industries, already active in the 12th century. For this reason, Lecco is also called "the Iron city".

Lecco has a population of 48,131 inhabitants.

Etymology 
The origin of the toponym Lecco is not certain: it probably has a Celtic origin (Lech or Loch) words that mean lake. Shortly before the year 1000 B.C., some populations of Gauls and Celts migrated to the territory of Lecco for trades. Leucos was the name given by the Gauls who inhabited these areas until Romans transformed the denomination into Leucum under Julius Caesar’s domination around 200 B.C.; so the hypothesis put forward by historians who have identified in Lecco the Roman city founded in 95 b.C. by Licinius Crassus in the Larian area with the name of Leucera was excluded. 

Other theories, perhaps legendary, trace etymology back to the Greek therm leukos (white), probably because of the white limestone rocks that can be found in Lecco; from the Latin lucus (forest) and/or lacus (lake). Other theories report a derivation from the Old Indian lokas (country) or Lithuanian laukas (open field). However, the existence of the city was first documented in 845 named Leuco.

History

Celtic and Roman periods 
In 1988 excavations of the Civic Museums of Lecco led to the discovery of a village of the Culture of Golasecca (first Iron Age) at the Rocca di Chiuso. The settlement of the Golasecchiani Celts in the area precedes the arrival of the Celts by more than 4 centuries.

In 2005 other excavations of the Civic Museums of Lecco and the University of Bergamo unearthed the oldest metallurgical production site in the entire Alpine arc (2nd century B.C. – 1st century B.C.) at piani d'Erna.

The Middle Ages 
As the nodal point of several streets that put Lombardy in communication with the territories of Oltralpe, the region becomes the scene of clashes and decisive battles. The fortified system of Lecco (Castrum Leuci) became the seat, with the Carolingian, of an important Committee entrusted to the Attonid family. In 960 Lecco was submitted to the lordship of the Archbishop of Milan. 

Throughout the Middle Ages and the Modern Age, the name of Lecco did not indicate an inhabited center but included the whole area between the lake and Valsassina. Lecco was a polycentric settlement, in which the various districts were closely interdependent, each with functional and economic specialization.

The Municipal and Viscount period 
In 1117 a ten-year war broke out pitting many villages of the lakes of Como and Lugano against Milan, of which Lecco was an ally. The inhabitants of Lecco took part in the battle and in March 1125 Como had to capitulate and the victors set it on fire. 

Later Lecco became involved in the struggles between the powerful Milanese families Visconti and Torriani (the owners of the Valsassina territories). In 1296 the struggles led Matthew I Visconti to destroy the village giving orders that it would never rise again. Despite the destruction, Lecco was rebuilt and reconquered by Azzone Visconti.  Throughout the period the community of Lecco, which included the entire current municipal territory, evolved as a free municipality with its statutes and, until 1757, was de facto a small autonomous state (with its own civil and criminal law), but inserted in the largest Duchy of Milan.

Spanish domination 
With the fall of the Duchy of Milan, Lecco passed to Spanish dominium and, under Charles V, was transformed into a military stronghold. In this period, it suffered, as all Milanese territory, from plagues and famines, which Manzoni admirably described in The Betrothed. In 1714 Lombardy passed to the control of Habsburgs of Austria.

Austrian domination 
In 1784 Joseph II of Austria visited the city and decided to destroy the walls. With the descent of Napoleon and the birth of the Cisalpine Republic in 1797, the Riviera di Lecco is part of the ephemeral Mountain Department. In 1814, after the final defeat of Napoleon, the Austrian army regains possession of the region and permanently brings Lecco back to the province of Como in 1816 (from which it will become independent only in 1995) and definitively divides the city into many small municipalities that will be re-established in 1923, during the Fascist 20th anniversary.

In the period of the Kingdom of Lombardy-Veneto, Lecco experienced positive effects: numerous interventions of modernization and development of the territory, such as the introduction of an efficient bureaucracy, the increase of the cadastre and industrial development that led to widespread well-being.

From Risorgimento to the post-war periods 
In the 19th  century Lecco became one of the beating hearts of Italian culture: the Scapigliati, a famous group of Milanese writers made Maggianico one of their favorite meeting places. The cultural ferment of the period was also associated with political ferment, and Lecco and its inhabitants played a very important role in the Lombard Risorgimento.

When the Milanese insurrection against Austria started in March 1848, a priest, Don Antonio Mascari, incited rebellion from the pulpit, but the insurrection that took place on the night between 18th  and March 19 was unsuccessful. By decree of June 22, 1848, the provisional government of Lombardy (the Austrian government had lapsed following the Five Days of Milan insurrection) promoted Lecco to the rank of City, thanks to the contribution that the city was making to the Cause of Risorgimento. However, Lecco was again downgraded to Borgo in 1859.

In 1859, with the Second War of Independence, Lecco and Lombardy were conquered by the Kingdom of Sardinia and, in the same year, it re-entered the title of City. 

In 1923 the municipal territory, which has now become insufficient to contain urban expansion, was greatly expanded with the aggregation of the neighboring municipalities of Acquate, Castello Sopra Lecco, Germanedo, Laorca, Rancio di Lecco and San Giovanni alla Castagna, as well as part of the municipal territory of Maggianico; in 1928 the remaining part of Maggianico was also aggregated.

Climate 

Lecco is the northernmost city (urban area) in Italy with a humid subtropical climate (Cfa defined by Köppen), only slightly softer than Milan. Despite being in a parallel dominated by a humid continental climate (Dfb), the territory is well sheltered from the mountain ranges, and from the climatic point of view, enjoys the beneficial influences of the lake's waters and the breath of the Tivano that blows from the Valtellina from the northeast all year round in the early hours of the morning. Its absence indicates bad weather.  Breva is another wind that runs towards the lake, from the south to the north and indicator of good weather.

Geography 

«That branch of the Lake of Como, which turns toward the south between two unbroken chains of mountains, presenting to the eye a succession of bays and gulfs, formed by their jutting and retiring ridges, suddenly contracts itself between a headland to the right and an extended sloping bank on the left, and assumes the flow and appearance of a river.»

The municipal territory covers an area of about 45.93 km². It is located in a wide valley bordered by the Prealps to the east and Lake Lario to the west, at the point where Lake Lario ends and the Adda river resumes its course and then re-expands into Lake Garlate. The territory is crossed by three main streams the Gerenzone, the Calderone and the Bione. The mountains that surround the natural wide- valley are: to the north mount Coltignone and San Martino, to the east mount Due Mani, Pizzo d'Erna and Resegone, to the south the Magnodeno, to the west, on the right bank of the Adda River, is Mount Barro. On the Adda river,  near the Azzone Visconti bridge, there is the small Viscontea Island.

The territory has a very variable altimeter distribution: it ranges from 198 meters above sea level in the lake area to the maximum altitude of 1875 meters above the sea level of Mount Resegone and this condition offers the city three different areas characterized by different morphologic and climatic characteristics.

The hydrography consists mainly of the stretch of the Adda river leaving the eastern branch of Lake Como and a series of streams, with their tributaries, which originates in the mountain range.

Lecco is delimited to the north rises the Massif of Monte Coltignone, mainly of limestone and dolomia of Esino, directly overlooking the lower peaks, such as Mount San Martino, Monte Melma, and Monte Albano. To the east the Resegone group, which, with its 1875 meters above the level of the sea, dominates the city characterizing the Lombard landscape up to Milan. Resegone is so named because of its multiple rocky teeth that, seen from the town, make it resemble a saw of gigantic size; Monte Serada, which dominates imposingly with its offshoots, which are the Piani d'Erna and the Pian Serada. To the southeast, beyond Maggianico, the greatest elevation is represented by the Magnodeno. To the west, there are the hills of north-eastern Brianza, among which stands out Mount Barro in which a regional park was established to protect local flora and fauna.

Architecture

Religious architecture
 Minor Basilica of San Nicolò
 Santa Marta, Lecco
 San Giovanni Battista
 Santi Materno e Lucia
 San Francesco d'Assisi
 Santi Gervasio e Protasio
 Chiesa di Castello
 San Giuseppe
 Madonna della Rovinata
 Santuario di Nostra Signora della Vittoria
 Santa Maria Gloriosa

Secular architecture
 Palazzo delle Paure
 Ponte Azzone Visconti (noto semplicemente come Ponte Vecchio)
 Villa Manzoni
 Memoriale ai Caduti
 Statua del Manzoni
 Monuments to Mario Cermenati and to Giuseppe Garibaldi

Traditions and folklore 
Traditional dresses 

The traditional women's dress in Lecco was linked to the image of Lucia of The Betrothed and is characterized by the ray of silver pins, called "guazze", which crowns the head. 
 

Manzoni procession

Although discontinuously organized, the tradition of the parade of floats inspired by the episodes of the novel is well-rooted in the territory.

The first edition took place in 1923, on the fiftieth anniversary of Manzoni's death. The procession was re-proposed in 1933, 1955, 1965, 2004, and October 2005 during the celebrations of the Festa di Lecco with 11 stage performances curated by 150 actors of the Teatro tascabile in Bergamo along the old town center. 

Carnevalone of Lecco

In February, since 1884 (edition n° 136 in 2020), on the occasion of the "Carnevalone di Lecco" there is the usual coronation of King Resegone and Regina Grigna, where the Mayor hands them the keys to the city to initiate the carnival folklore, that reaches its peak, according to the Ambrosian rite the city follows, with the Fat Saturday day and the traditional procession of floats.

ResegUp

It is a trail running that usually takes place on the first Saturday of June. Established in 2010, it aims to retrace the ancient paths that lead from the historic center to the summit of Resegone erased over the years due to the urbanization of the city. 

Batej Regatta

It is the traditional regatta that takes place on the banks of the Adda river in July (variable date) on the occasion of the Palio delle contrade in Pescarenico. The boats are eight, each of them in different colors to represent the districts. The regatta is preceded by the regatta of the "Lucie", the boats typical of the lake, and different representations of historical uses and customs typical of the area.

Scigamatt Race

Born in the district of Acquate during the event of the Scigalott d'Or (the name derives from the Lecco dialects Cicala d'oro), the race was held during the odd years on an obstacle course of 4 km in a mixed asphalt and dirt road. The event is in remembrance of June 6, 1859, when the inhabitants of the district went to Lecco to cheer General Giuseppe Garibaldi, accompanying him during the march with songs similar to the cicadas.

Manzoni's places 
Manzoni's places are the places, or what remains of them, that served as an inspiration to the writer and mentioned in the novel The Betrothed. A historical-literary-tourist itinerary among the few old parts of the city spared from the urban expansion linked to industrial development was created. Some places are historical, such as the monastery of Fra Cristoforo in Pescarenico or the Azzone Visconti bridge, others indicated by tradition, such as the alleged house of Lucia Mondella in the district of Olate, the tabernacle of the Bravi, the Palazzotto of Don Rodrigo, the house of the tailor in Chiuso, the Innominato's stronghold and Villa Manzoni in the Caleotto district (today Manzonian Civic Museum), the residence of Manzoni's family in which he lived his childhood, adolescence, and early youth as he wrote in the introduction of the novel "Fermo and Lucia".

Convent of Fra Cristoforo 
Situated in the district of Pescarenico, this church is now dedicated to Saints Lucia and Materno. In The Betrothed (Manzoni novel), Manzoni cites this place as the conventual seat of Fra Cristoforo.

Alleged Lucia Mondella's house 
The alleged house of Lucia is located in Via Caldone 19 in the district of Olate (which at the time it was separated from Lecco); designated by various scholars of manzonian topography as the village of the spouses, is a typical example of spontaneous architecture of Lecco. Through a portal decorated with a sixteenth-century Annunciation, you pass in the rustic courtyard, overlooked by an old tower, although it is not open to visitors as the house appears to be a private residence. The popular tradition points out another house of Lucia in Via Resegone, in the hamlet of Acquate, where there is an old inn, from whose courtyard you can clearly see the hill of Don Rodrigo's Palace.

Tabernacolo dei Bravi 
It is a small chapel located on the side of the pedestrian Via Tonio and Gervaso, described by the literary tradition of Manzoni as the place of the famous stakeout of Don Abbondio by the Bravi to tell him the message of their lord Don Rodrigo.

Villa Manzoni 
The paternal residence of Alessandro Manzoni has a neoclassical style and it is located in the Caleotto district; it houses the Civic Museum of Manzoni and the Municipal Art Gallery. The building is considered the symbol of the link between Manzoni and the city of Lecco. The incipit of The Betrothed (Manzoni novel) comes from the meticulous visual memories of the landscape that the writer saw from this villa.

Government

Transport

Buses

Until 2017, bus services in Lecco were provided mainly by Servizi Automobilistici Lecchesi until 2017, when the company merged into SAB Bergamo, creating Arriva Italia. Bus services to Como are provided by ASF Autolinee, while Flixbus caters for longer distance bus relations. 

The urban bus services in Lecco, managed by Linee Lecco, are the following:

1 Calolzio FS/Vercurago/Chiuso-Maggianico-Laorca
2 Ospedale-Parco Eremo (clockwise circular)
3 Parco Eremo-Ospedale (anticlockwise circular)
4 Gaggio-Parco Eremo-Ospedale-Cereda
5 Funivia-Parco Eremo-Ospedale-Via Montello/Villa Brick
6 Rivabella-Belledo
7 Calolzio FS-Vecurago-Chiuso-Maggianico-Ospedale-Parco Eremo-Laorca/Ballabio/Resinelli
8 Rancio-Germanedo
9 Lecco FS-Valmadrera
10 Lecco-Melgone-Onno-Vassena-Limonta-Visgnola-Bellagio
11 Calolzio FS-Lorentino-Evre
12 Calolzio FS/Carenno-Sopracornola
13 Calolzio FS-Marenzo-Torre de Busi-Sogno-Colle di Sogno

Interurban services departing from Lecco include:

C46 Como-Erba-Lecco (ASF Autolinee)
D20 Lecco-Mandello (Arriva Italia)
D35 Lecco-Ballabio-Cremeno-Barzio-Taceno (Arriva Italia)
D40 Vecurago-Calolzio FS-Bisone-Cisana (Arriva Italia)
D50 Lecco-Pescate-Olginate-Calolzio-Olginate-Valgreghentino-Airuno FS-Brivio-Arlate-Imbersago-Merate/Cernusco/Lomagna (Arriva Italia)
D55 Lecco-Pescate-Galbiate-Ello-Ravellino-Oggiono-Annione Brianza (Arriva Italia)
D60 Lecco-Oggiono-Castello (Brianza)-Barzanò-Missaglia-Casatenovo-Carate Brianza-Seregno (Arriva Italia)
E03 Celana-Caprino Bergamasco-Cisano FS-Brivio-Olgiate FS (Arriva Italia)

Rail

The municipality has two railway station Lecco, which is the town's main station; and Lecco Maggianico, which is the second main railway station and has a freight terminal in its premises. On both stations, the main operator is Trenord.

Navigation

Whilst in the past there was a much more frequent navigation service around Lake Como departing from Lecco, in the recent year the town's pier was mainly used for seasonal services, pleasure boat rides and charter services.

Former modes of transport

Between 1927 and 1953, Lecco had its own urban tramway network, which was connected to the Como-Erba-Lecco interurban tramway, which operated between 1928 and 1955.

Cable Car

An aerial cable car operates between Versasio and Piani d'Erna, and was inaugurated in 1965.

Sport
The town's football team Calcio Lecco 1912 currently play in Serie C. Their traditional rivalry with the team of the city of Como is marked by the so-called Derby del Lario, often surrounded by violence between fans, created by the local ultras group Cani Sciolti.

The main sports facility of the city is the Rigamonti-Ceppi Stadium, where the football team trains and plays. It was built in 1922 in honor of the football player Mario Rigamonti and the ex-president of the team Mario Ceppi. It can contain almost 5000 people.

Lecco has been on multiple occasions the finish place of the Giro di Lombardia cycling classic.

Notable people
 Alessandro Manzoni (1785–1873), poet and novelist, author of I promessi sposi, belonged to an old family of Lecco.
 Antonio Stoppani (1824–1891), geologist and palaeontologist.
 Antonio Ghislanzoni (1824–1893), journalist, poet, and novelist; he wrote many librettos for Verdi, including La forza del destino and Aida.
 Carlo Mauri (1930–1982), climber and explorer.
 Antonio Rossi (born 1968), a canoeist and five-time Olympic medalist in kayak flatwater canoeing.
 Manuel Locatelli (born 1998), a footballer who plays for Juventus and Italy.

Cultural references
Alessandro Manzoni set the events in the first half of The Betrothed in Lecco, a town he knew deeply since he had spent part of his childhood there.

International relations

Twin towns – Sister cities
Lecco is twinned with:
  Mâcon, France since 1973
  Overijse, Belgium since 1981
  Igualada, Spain since 1990
  Szombathely, Hungary since 1995
  Mytishchi, Russia since 2005

Gallery

See also
 Lecco railway station
 Alpine Town of the Year 2013

References

Bibliography 

 Cattaneo Editore, Mariagrazia Furlani Marchi, Aroldo Benini, Massimiliano Bartesaghi, G. Scotti, Luoghi manzoniani a Lecco, 1991, .
 Mondadori Electa, G. Luigi Daccò, Itinerari manzoniani a Lecco, 1997, .
 Mondadori Electa, G. Luigi Daccò, Manzoni a Lecco. Luoghi e memorie, 2009, .

External links
 Home (comune.lecco.it)
 Informazione e accoglienza turistica – Provincia di Lecco
 Pictures of Lecco railway bridge
Infopoint Lecco (in-lombardia.it)
Alessandro Manzoni Itinerary – Alessandro Manzoni – Cultural Tourism Lombardy – in-lombardia (in-lombardia.it)
https://www.eccolecco.it/en/manzonian-places-lecco/

 
Cities and towns in Lombardy
Valsassina